William Devereux (born 23 January 1991) is an Irish hurler who plays as a right corner-back for the Wexford senior team.

Devereux made his first appearance for the team during the 2012 championship and immediately became a regular member of the starting fifteen.

At the club level, Devereux is a three-time county club championship medalist with St Martin's, winning titles with them in 2008, 2017 and 2019.

References

1991 births
Living people
St Martin's (Wexford) hurlers
Wexford inter-county hurlers